Sri Krishna College of Engineering & Technology (SKCET) is an autonomous technical institution affiliated to Anna University based on Coimbatore. It is located in a twenty-acre campus at Sugunapuram along the Palakkad-Coimbatore Highway, near Kuniyamuthur, Coimbatore in Indian state of Tamil Nadu. The college was started in 1998 with 180 students and 18 staff and offered four courses in the Bachelor of Engineering (B.E.). Qualifications are conferred by Anna University.

The Institution has secured 73rd rank among the top engineering Institutions from NIRF. At present, the college has more than 2,500 students and more than 200 teaching and non-teaching staff.

Rankings

The National Institutional Ranking Framework (NIRF) ranked it 83 among engineering colleges in 2020.
The National Institutional Ranking Framework (NIRF) ranked it 78 among engineering Colleges in 2021.
The National Institutional Ranking Framework (NIRF) ranked it 73 among engineering Colleges in 2022.<ref
name=Rankings_NIRF_E_2022/>

4th Rank in 2021, 2nd Rank in 2019 in Atal Ranking of Institutions on Innovation Achievements (ARIIA)

Ranked 5th among private engineering Colleges in Tamilnadu in 2021 by India Today.

Ranked 3rd in 2020 & 2nd in 2019 by AICTE as Clean and Smart Campus in India.

Campus
The campus is about 8 km from the city of Coimbatore. The facilities include classrooms with multimedia equipment/overhead projectors, faculty and administrative blocks, a modern library and computer labs, and a three-storey student residence. There are separate blocks for respective departments of engineering fully equipped with modernised instruments to cultivate practical knowledge in every students. The mechanical department is largest and oldest department at SKCET with a wide range of faculty and students. The mechanical block is the largest among all. It has a research and development lab to design and build vehicles for students who are an active member of SAE (Society of automobile engineers-coimbatore chapter). The present Head of the department of mechanical is Dr. Ashoka Varthan, who has lectured for 25 years and is a scholar and an author. He has written many books in mechanical engineering subjects. He has also served in PRICOL (the speedometer industry) at Coimbatore. His presence adds a big advantage to the college especially for mechanical students.

Infrastructure
 Approximately 5 lakh sq.ft. of instructional area in classrooms and laboratories
 20 computer laboratories with 1,200 terminals
 8 Mbit/s (1:1) leased line Internet connectivity; all the systems in the campus are networked
 2 Mbit/s dedicated VPN connectivity between the college and Anna University, Coimbatore
 55,000 sq.ft. of air conditioned central library block with approximately 42,000 volumes of books and 1,000 periodicals of international and national journals and magazines; Internet access to all the e-journals and e-books is enabled
 Food Court
Library (Venkatraman Learning Centre)
Stationary, hotels and small book stores
Gym
Krishna Square
 Sri Krishna Temple
 Chat Cafe

Courses Offered 
SKCET offers 8 Undergraduate courses, 9 Postgraduate Courses and 1 Integrated course.

Undergraduate Course 
 B.E. Computer Science and Engineering
 B.E. Computer Science and Design
 B.E. Mechanical Engineering
 B.E. Mechatronics Engineering
 B.E. Civil Engineering
 B.E. Electrical and Electronics Engineering
 B.E. Electronics and Communication Engineering
 B.Tech. Information Technology 
 B.Tech. Computer Science and Business Systems (Powered by TCS)
 B.Tech.Artificial  intelligence and Data Science
 B.Tech.Cyber Security

Postgraduate Course 

 M.E Computer Science and Engineering 
 M.E. Software Engineering
 M.E. Applied Electronics
 M.E. Communication Systems
 M.E. Engineering Design
 M.E. CAD/CAM
 M.E. Power Electronics and Drivers
 Master of Business Administration (MBA)
 Master of Computer Application (MCA)

Integrated Course (5 Year) 
 M.Tech. Computer Science and Engineering (Powered by Virtusa)

Notable alumni
Athulya Ravi, Actress

References

External links
SKCET Official Website

Engineering colleges in Tamil Nadu
Colleges affiliated to Anna University
All India Council for Technical Education
Education in Coimbatore district
Educational institutions established in 1998
1998 establishments in Tamil Nadu